Abdulaziz Adel (Arabic:عبد العزيز عادل) (born 10 September 1993) is a Qatari footballer. He currently plays as a winger for Qatar .

Career

Qatar SC
Abdulaziz Adel started his career at Qatar SC and is a product of the Qatar's youth system. On 18 January 2014, Adel made his professional debut for Qatar SC against Muaither in the Pro League, replacing Adriano . He landed with Qatar SC from the Qatar Stars League to the Qatari Second Division in 2015-16 season . And end up with Qatar SC from the Qatari Second Division to the Qatar Stars League in the 2016-17 season .

Al-Markhiya
In 2018, he left Qatar SC and signed with Al-Markhiya.

Qatar SC
On 6 July 2019 left Al-Markhiya and return with Qatar SC. On 21 August 2019, Adel made his professional debut for Qatar SC against Al-Duhail in the Pro League, replacing Junior Kabananga .

External links

References

Living people
1993 births
Qatari footballers
Qatar SC players
Al-Markhiya SC players
Qatar Stars League players
Qatari Second Division players
Association football wingers
Place of birth missing (living people)